Joey Ellis may refer to:

 Joey Foster Ellis, a New York artist
 Joey Ellis (Benidorm), a fictional character of Benidorm

See also
 Joseph Ellis (disambiguation)